Marek Daćko (born 29 March 1991) is a Polish handball player for NMC Górnik Zabrze and the Polish national team.

He participated at the 2017 World Men's Handball Championship.

References

1991 births
Living people
People from Bartoszyce
Polish male handball players